is a Japanese footballer currently playing as a midfielder for Vanraure Hachinohe as a designated special player.

Career statistics

Club
.

Notes

References

2000 births
Living people
Association football people from Hokkaido
Sapporo University alumni
Japanese footballers
Association football midfielders
J3 League players
Vanraure Hachinohe players